F-100 and F-75 (also known as Formula 100 and Formula 75) are therapeutic milk products designed to treat severe malnutrition. In 1994, Action Against Hunger/Action Contre la Faim (ACF) pioneered the use of milk formula F-100 for the treatment of severe acute malnutrition. In 1997, a French medical researcher together with the French company Nutriset succeeded in making a nutrient-dense spread for the treatment of severe acute malnutrition. The formula is used in therapeutic feeding centres where children are hospitalized for treatment. Action Against Hunger’s Scientific Committee pioneered the therapeutic milk formula (F-100), now used by all major humanitarian aid organizations to treat acute malnutrition. As a result, the global mortality rate of severely malnourished children under the age of five has been reduced from 25% to 5%. F-100 and other therapeutic nutritional products are widely used by a number of humanitarian aid organizations, such as UNICEF, Action Against Hunger, Concern Worldwide, Valid International, and Médecins Sans Frontières, when treating severe malnutrition among vulnerable populations.

F-75 is considered the "starter" formula, and F-100 the "catch-up" formula. The designations mean that the product contains respectively 75 and 100 kcals per 100 ml. Both are very high in energy, fat, and protein, and provide a large amount of nutrients. Ingredients include concentrated milk powder, food oil (sometimes grease), and dextrin vitamin complexes. The formulas may be prepared by mixing with the local water supply. Sometimes Plumpy'nut is substituted for F-100. F-75 may be cereal-based in place of milk. F-75 provides 75 kcal and 0.9 g protein per 100 mL, while F-100 provides 100 kcal and 2.9 g protein. There are other variants like Low Lactose F-75 and Lactose Free F-75, which are used in case of persistent diarrhoea in severe acute malnutrition.

References

5. GHAI Essential of pediatrics(8th edition) : page 106 (chapter 7 : Nutrition) 
Bibliography
 

Malnutrition
Milk
Dietary supplements